Sir Alfred Dyer JP (9 February 1865 – 15 November 1947) was a British newspaper editor, politician, and company director.

Career
In the 1890s, Dyer was the editor of the Gravesend & Northfleet Standard. From 1902 to 1940, he was the editor of the Hastings & St Leonards Observer. Following this, he was the chief executive officer of P. J. Parsons, Ltd, proprietors of the Hastings & St Leonards Observer.

From 1921 to July 1946, Dyer served as chairman of the Hastings Conservative Association. Upon his retirement, the association thanked him for "untiring and loyal work for the party".

When the Rosemount Bowling Club was formed in 1921, Eustace Percy, 1st Baron Percy of Newcastle and MP for Hastings, was invited to become its President and Dyer its Vice-President. When Percy left the constituency in 1937, Dyer became the Club's second President, which he retained until his death in 1947.

Death and legacy
In the 1936 Birthday Honours, Dyer was made a Knight Bachelor for "political and public services in Hastings". Dyer remains the only editor of a Sussex newspaper upon whom a knighthood has ever been bestowed.

Sir Alfred Dyer died on Saturday 15 November 1947 in the Buchanan Hospital in St Leonards-on-Sea. The Mayor of Hastings, Alderman F. W. Chambers, said it was fitting that they should recognise "the great loss the Bench, the town, and the country had suffered."

Personal life
On 2 September 1895 in Heavitree, England, Dyer married Edith Kate Havill, with whom he had two children.

References

1865 births
1947 deaths
Havill family
People from Dover, Kent
English newspaper editors
English chief executives
Conservative Party (UK) politicians
Knights Bachelor
English justices of the peace